A Room of One's Own is an extended essay by Virginia Woolf, first published in September 1929. The work is based on two lectures Woolf delivered in October 1928 at Newnham College and Girton College, women's colleges at the University of Cambridge.

In her essay, Woolf uses metaphors to explore social injustices and comments on women's lack of free expression. Her metaphor of a fish explains her most essential point, "A woman must have money and a room of her own if she is to write fiction". She writes of a woman whose thought had "let its line down into the stream". As the woman starts to think of an idea, a guard enforces a rule whereby women are not allowed to walk on the grass. Abiding by the rule, the woman loses her idea. Here, Woolf describes the influence of women's social expectations as mere domestic child bearers, ignorant and chaste.

The political meaning of the text is directly linked to this metaphor. When the emergence of the 'new woman' occurred, this awareness of injustice made a clear political statement regarding women's intellectual potential in their own right. Therefore, the broader literary influence of this argument reveals the increase in social tension as the century's shift looms. Woolf suggests that the absence of female fiction is a result of a lack of opportunity rather than a distinct absence of talent.

The association between poverty and low achievement can also lead to disadvantages for generations. As women have been for decades marginalized and the patriarchy dominated literature, Woolf's general theory can be extended to many political circumstances. In this case, children are extremely conscious of their social status and thus aware of their own possibilities or absence, similar to the 'fish' metaphor in which women were aware of their position and lost their 'thinking'. It helps us to see how social problems shift shape, but the absence of opportunity still causes isolation and inequality.

History
The essay was based on two papers Woolf read on 20 and 26 October 1928 to two Cambridge student societies, the Newnham Arts Society at Newnham College and the ODTAA Society at Girton College, respectively. Elsie Duncan-Jones, then known as Elsie Phare, was the president of the Newnham Arts Society at the time and wrote an account of the paper, "Women and Fiction", for the college magazine, Thersites. Woolf stayed at Newnham at the invitation of Pernel Strachey, the college principal, whose family were key members of the Bloomsbury Group. At Girton she was accompanied by Vita Sackville-West. It was published in 1929 as a book with six chapters.

Themes

The Four Marys
The title of the essay comes from Woolf's conception that "a woman must have money and a room of her own if she is to write fiction". The narrator of the work is referred to early on: "Here then was I (call me Mary Beton, Mary Seton, Mary Carmichael or by any name you please—it is not a matter of any importance)". The two Marys were ladies-in-waiting to Mary, Queen of Scots; they are also characters in a 16th-century Scottish ballad, Mary Hamilton, about a lady-in-waiting who is facing execution for having had a child with the King, a child she killed.

In referencing the tale of a woman who rejected motherhood and lived outside marriage, a woman about to be hanged, the narrator identifies women writers such as herself as outsiders who exist in a potentially dangerous space.

Women's access to education

The essay examines whether women were capable of producing, and in fact free to produce, work of the quality of William Shakespeare, addressing the limitations that past and present women writers face.

Woolf's father, Sir Leslie Stephen, in line with the thinking of the era, believed that only the boys of the family should be sent to school. In delivering the lectures outlined in the essay, Woolf is speaking to women who have the opportunity to learn in a formal setting. She moves her audience to understand the importance of their education, while warning them of the precariousness of their position in society. She sums up the stark contrast between how women are idealised in fiction written by men, and how patriarchal society has treated them in real life:

Women have burnt like beacons in all the works of all the poets from the beginning of time. Indeed if woman had no existence save in the fiction written by men, one would imagine her a person of the utmost importance; very various; heroic and mean; splendid and sordid; beautiful and hideous in the extreme; as great as a man, some would say greater. But this is woman in fiction. In fact, as Professor Trevelyan points out, she was locked up, beaten and flung about the room. A very queer, composite being thus emerges. Imaginatively she is of the highest importance; practically she is completely insignificant. She pervades poetry from cover to cover; she is all but absent from history. She dominates the lives of kings and conquerors in fiction; in fact she was the slave of any boy whose parents forced a ring upon her finger. Some of the most inspired words and profound thoughts in literature fall from her lips; in real life she could hardly read; scarcely spell; and was the property of her husband.

Judith Shakespeare

In one section Woolf invents a fictional character, Judith, Shakespeare's sister, to illustrate that a woman with Shakespeare's gifts would have been denied the opportunity to develop them. Like Woolf, who stayed at home while her brothers went off to school, Judith is trapped in the home: "She was as adventurous, as imaginative, as agog to see the world as he was. But she was not sent to school."

While William learns, Judith is chastised by her parents should she happen to pick up a book, as she is inevitably abandoning some household chore to which she could be attending. Judith is betrothed, and when she does not want to marry, her father beats her, then shames her into the marriage. While William establishes himself, Judith is trapped by what is expected of women. She runs away from home to London, is harassed and laughed at when she tries to become an actor, and is finally made pregnant by an actor-manager who said he would help her. She kills herself and "lies buried at some cross-roads where the omnibuses now stop outside the Elephant and Castle". William lives on and establishes his legacy.

Building a history of women's writing

In the essay, Woolf constructs a critical and historical account of women writers thus far.  Woolf examines the careers of several female authors, including Aphra Behn, Jane Austen, the Brontë sisters, Anne Finch, Countess of Winchilsea, and George Eliot.
In addition to female authors, Woolf also discusses and draws inspiration from noted scholar and feminist Jane Ellen Harrison. Harrison is presented in the essay only by her initials separated by long dashes, and Woolf first introduces Harrison as "the famous scholar, could it be J---- H---- herself?"

Woolf also discusses Rebecca West, questioning Desmond MacCarthy's (referred to as "Z") uncompromising dismissal of West as an "'arrant feminist'". Among the men attacked for their views on women, F. E. Smith, 1st Earl of Birkenhead (referred to as "Lord Birkenhead") is mentioned, although Woolf further rebukes his ideas in stating she will not "trouble to copy out Lord Birkenhead's opinion upon the writing of women". Birkenhead was an opponent of suffrage. The essay quotes Oscar Browning, through the words of his (possibly inaccurate) biographer H. E. Wortham, "that the impression left on his mind, after looking over any set of examination papers, was that, irrespective of the marks he might give, the best woman was intellectually the inferior of the worst man". In addition to these mentions, Woolf subtly refers to several of the most prominent intellectuals of the time.

Lesbianism
Woolf wrote in her diary before A Room of One's Own was published that she thought when it was published she would be "attacked for a feminist & hinted at for a sapphist".

In one section of the book, describing the work of a fictional woman writer, Mary Carmichael, Woolf deliberately invokes lesbianism: "Then may I tell you that the very next words I read were these – 'Chloe liked Olivia ...' Do not start. Do not blush. Let us admit in the privacy of our own society that these things sometimes happen. Sometimes women do like women." Woolf references the obscenity trial and public uproar resulting from the publishing of Radclyffe Hall's lesbian-themed novel The Well of Loneliness (1928). Before she can discuss Chloe liking Olivia, the narrator has to be assured that Sir Chartres Biron, the magistrate of Hall's obscenity trial, is not in the audience: "Are there no men present? Do you promise the figure of Sir Chartres Biron is not concealed? We are all women, you assure me? Then I may tell you ..."

Woolf scholar and feminist critic Jane Marcus believes Woolf was giving Radclyffe Hall and other writers a demonstration of how to discuss lesbianism discreetly enough to avoid obscenity trials; "Woolf was offering her besieged fellow writer a lesson in how to give a lesbian talk and write a lesbian work and get away with it." Marcus describes the atmosphere of Woolf's arrival and presence at the women's college with her lover Vita Sackville-West as "sapphic". Woolf is comfortable discussing lesbianism in her talks with the women students because she feels a women's college is a safe and essential place for such discussions.

Criticism
Alice Walker responded to Woolf's observation that only women with 'a room of their own' are in a position to write. Woolf herself was making the point that not all women in her society had such a safe space, but Walker continues the conversation by discussing the further exclusions suffered by women of colour. In In Search of Our Mothers' Gardens: Womanist Prose, Walker writes:

Adaptations and cultural references
In 1975 the Madison, Wisconsin bookstore A Room of One's Own was founded by five women as a feminist bookstore.

A literary journal launched in Vancouver, Canada in 1975 by the West Coast Feminist Literary Magazine Society, or the Growing Room Collective, was originally called Room of One's Own but changed to Room in 2007.

The Smiths' 1985 song "Shakespeare's Sister" is named after a section of the essay. Shakespears Sister, founded in 1988, is an alternative pop group featuring Siobhan Fahey. The name was adapted from the title of the Smiths' song; however, Fahey has described the meaning of the name being, "Siobhan Fahey is the mother, the sister, the daughter, it's not the artist. The artist is Shakespear's sister."

A Room of One's Own was adapted as a play by Patrick Garland that premiered in 1989 with Eileen Atkins; a television adaptation of that play was broadcast on PBS Masterpiece Theatre in 1991.

The Leather Archives and Museum, founded in 1991, has an exhibit called A Room of Her Own, about which curator Alex Warner has written, "As I began work for the first exhibit installation of the Women’s Leather History Project, I was excited that we were both literally and figuratively making room for Leatherwomen’s history in the LA&M. It was out of this line of thinking that "A Room of Her Own" emerged, building on Virginia Woolf's 1929 feminist text that argues for women's need for space to think and create".

The Two Nice Girls' third album, from 1991, was called Chloe Liked Olivia, referencing the essay.

Chloe plus Olivia: an anthology of lesbian literature from the seventeenth century to the present was published in 1994 by Lillian Faderman; the phrase "Chloe plus Olivia" is a reference to the essay.

A blog eventually called Shakesville started in 2004 as Shakespeare's Sister; the blog ended in 2019. It was named after the Smiths' song "Shakespeare's Sister" and the essay, because (in regard to the essay), "I [the blog's original author, Melissa McEwan] am the heir of all the Shakespeare's Sisters before me, who carved out rooms of their own, tiny pieces of space and time, in which they formed the habit of freedom and mustered the courage to write exactly what they thought. I took up their legacy with breathless gratitude and compelling need, and I created a room of my own, built of 1s and 0s, where I try to honor them, as best I can".

The name of the fan fiction site Archive of Our Own, which was established in 2009, is inspired by the essay.

Patricia Lamkin's play Balancing the Moon (2011) was inspired by the essay.

A women's co-working space in Singapore, "Woolf Works", opened in 2014 and was named after Virginia Woolf in tribute to the essay.

A Room of Her Own Foundation (AROHO), which is a foundation for women writers and artists, is named after the essay.

See also
 Feminism: The Essential Historical Writings, a notable anthology in which A Room of One's Own is included
 Le Monde 100 Books of the Century, which lists A Room of One's Own as number 69

Notes

References

External links
 (1991, with Eileen Atkins).
 Longworth, Deborah (1 March 2017). "Virginia Woolf and Feminist Aesthetics", lecture on A Room of One's Own, University of Birmingham.

1929 books
1929 essays
Books by Virginia Woolf
Hogarth Press books
Feminist books
Feminist essays
Monodrama
Plays for one performer